The Lancer 36 is an American sailboat that was designed by Bill Lee as a racer-cruiser and first built in 1973.

In 1982 the boat was reintroduced with a fractional rig as the Lancer 36 FR.

Production
The prototype boat, Chutzpah was built the year before Lancer Yachts was formed and was the impetus for starting the company.

Design
The Lancer 36 is a recreational keelboat, built predominantly of fiberglass, with wood trim. It has a masthead sloop rig, a raked stem, a reverse transom, an internally mounted spade-type rudder controlled by a wheel and a fixed fin keel. It displaces  and carries  of ballast.

The design had a number of interior arrangements available. The cruising interior includes sleeping accommodation for six people, with a double "V"-berth around a drop-leaf table in the bow cabin and two aft cabins, each with a double berth. The galley is located on the starboard side just forward of the companionway ladder. The galley is "L"-shaped and is equipped with a two-burner stove and a double sink. A navigation station is opposite the galley, on the port side. The head is located opposite the galley on the port side and includes a shower.

For sailing downwind the design may be equipped with a symmetrical or asymmetrical spinnaker.

Operational history
The prototype boat, Chutzpah, won the Transpacific Yacht Race in both 1973 and 1975.

See also
List of sailing boat types

References

External links
Photo of a Lancer 36 showing the bow
Photo of a Lancer 36 showing the stern
Photo of a Lancer 36 sailing

Keelboats
1970s sailboat type designs
Sailing yachts
Sailboat types built in the United States
Sailboat type designs by American designers
Sailboat types built by Lancer Yachts